The 2010 Beni-Ilmane earthquakes began 14 May at 12:29:22 UTC, when a  5.3 strike-slip earthquake occurred in Northern Algeria. With a maximum EMS-98 intensity of VII (Damaging), it was the first in a sequence of three shocks that affected the Bouïra Province over a ten-day period. Two people were killed, forty-three were injured, and some structural damage was reported.

See also
List of earthquakes in 2010
List of earthquakes in Algeria

References

Sources

External links
Algeria earthquake kills two – Reuters
Earthquake kills two and injures 43 in northern Algeria – France 24

Algeria Earthquake, 2010
A
Bouïra Province
Earthquakes in Algeria
Earthquake clusters, swarms, and sequences
2010 disasters in Algeria